Maryland Million Sprint Handicap is an American Thoroughbred horse race held annually in October since 1986 primarily at Laurel Park Racecourse in Laurel, Maryland or at Pimlico Race Course in Baltimore. To be eligible for the Maryland Million Sprint Handicap, a horse must be sired by a stallion who stands in Maryland. Due to that restriction the race is classified as a non-graded or "listed" stakes race and is not eligible for grading by the American Graded Stakes Committee.

The race is part of Maryland Million Day, a 12-race program held in mid-October that was the creation of renowned television sports journalist Jim McKay. The "Maryland Million" is the first State-Bred showcase event ever created. Since 1986, 27 other events in 20 states have imitated the showcase and its structure.

In 1986 the race was called the First National Bank of Maryland Sprint Handicap. In 1987 and 1988 the race was called the Jiffy Lube Sprint Handicap. In 1989 the race was sponsored by the state Department of Tourism and was called the State of Maryland Sprint Handicap. From 1990 to 1993 the race was called the U.S. Air Maryland Sprint Handicap. In 1994–1995 the race was called the B.W.I. Airport Maryland Sprint Handicap. In 2003 the race was called the Susquehanna Bank Maryland Sprint Handicap and in 2007 the race was called the Fasi-Tipton Sprint Handicap. The race currently offers a purse of $100,000.

In its 30th running in 2015, the race was restricted to those horses who were sired by a stallion who stands in the state of Maryland. Both the entrant horse and their stallion must be nominated to the Maryland Million program.

Records 

Most wins: 
 no multiple winners of the Maryland Million Sprint Handicap

Speed record: 
 1:08.56 – McKendree (2000)

Most wins by an owner:
 no multiple winners of the Maryland Million Spint Handicap

Most wins by a jockey:
 3 – Mario Pino     (2002, 1996 and 1991)
 3 – Ramon Domínguez     (2009, 2007 and 2003)

Most wins by a trainer:
 3 – Richard Dutrow     (1998, 1988 and 1986)

Winners of the Maryland Million Sprint Handicap since 1986

See also 
 Maryland Million Sprint Handicap top three finishers
 Maryland Million Day
 Laurel Park Racecourse

References

 Maryland Thoroughbred official website

Horse races in Maryland
Horse races in the United States
Recurring events established in 1986
Laurel Park Racecourse
Recurring sporting events established in 1986
1986 establishments in Maryland